Erika Rudolf (July 21, 1954 in Budapest – February 2009) was a Hungarian high jumper.

She finished eighth at the 1973 European Indoor Championships and fifth at the 1977 European Indoor Championships. She became Hungarian champion in 1971 and 1976.

References

External links
sports-reference
Death mention

1954 births
2009 deaths
Hungarian female high jumpers
Athletes from Budapest
Athletes (track and field) at the 1972 Summer Olympics
Olympic athletes of Hungary